Johan Kristian Kongstad (1867 – 1929) was a Danish printer and illustrator. Among others, he studied under Kristian Zahrtmann. He operated a printing press between 1902 and 1921, and made about 40 titles. He is also credited with designing about 500 book covers.

References

External links
 

1867 births
1929 deaths
19th-century Danish illustrators
20th-century Danish illustrators
Danish printers